The San Antonio Housing Authority is a housing authority located in San Antonio, Texas and is the largest housing authority in Texas determined by number of housing units. It is the only Moving to Work Housing Authority in Texas, a designation by HUD given to high performing housing authorities.  Their main programs are Section 8 housing, Affordable Housing and Low-Income Housing. Locally the organization is referred to as "SAHA" (pronounced Saw-Ha). SAHA is also one of the few housing authorities to develop their own units. In 2008, SAHA was listed as the 5th largest affordable housing developer in the United States with 1,205 units completed.

External links

References

Homelessness organizations
Political advocacy groups in the United States
Homelessness in the United States
Public housing in Texas